Slavs!: Thinking About the Longstanding Problems of Virtue and Happiness is a 1994 play by Tony Kushner, set in the USSR as it crumbles and during its later rebirth as a collection of independent states. The play has four acts, beginning in 1985 and ending in 1992. The play premiered at the Actors Theatre of Louisville in Louisville, Kentucky on 8 March 1994. It later moved to the New York Theatre Workshop on 12 December 1994, in a production featuring Academy Award winner Marisa Tomei and Mischa Barton.

Plot
The action begins in Moscow in March 1985 as Mikhail Gorbachev succeeds Konstantin Chernenko as general secretary of the Communist Party.

Katherina is a feisty lesbian security guard at a Soviet archive facility that holds the brains of the USSR's late leaders. After getting her the job at the facility, Popolitipov (Jones), an apparatchik, attempts to woo her. Unfortunately for Popolitipov, she has already fallen for the oncologist Bonfila (Schulz), a descendant of one of the fathers of the revolution.

Serge is a Bolshevik whose obsession with the future has deadly results. Vodya is a young girl that is dying from nuclear waste poisoning. She appears as both an apparition during a man's inebriated state and again in 1992 in Siberia but this time alive and mute.It is there in Siberia where Katherina and Bonfila confront the fallout and human misery caused by nuclear waste. Rodent, an unintelligent bureaucrat, is also sent on a good-will mission to the country, where he confronts the misery of a mute Vodya and her enraged mother.

New York production

Cast
Marisa Tomei as Kathrerina Serafima Gleb
Mischa Barton as Vodya Domik
Joseph Wiseman as Prelapsarianov
Barbara Eda-Young as First Babushka and Mrs. Domik
Ben Hammer as Smukov
John Christopher Jones as Popolitipov
Mary Shultz as Second Babushka and Bonch-Bruevich
David Chandler as Rodent
Gerald Hiken as Serge

Crew
Direction by Lisa Peterson
Set design by Neil Patel
Costumes by Gabriel Berry
Lighting by Christopher Akerlind
Sound by Darron L. West

Reception
Slavs! New York production was warmly received by Vincent Canby of The New York Times; "he has created a rambunctiously funny, seriously moving stage piece that is part buffoonish burlesque and part tragic satire. From beginning to end, it's also shot through with the kind of irony virtually unknown in today's theater, movies and television, where sarcasm passes for wit." Canby continued to describe the play as "a work of a brilliant and restless imagination." Canby continued "Mr. Kushner's words dazzle, sting and prompt belly laughs. In them are also echoes of the kind of Russian mysticism that can be detected in Chekhov, though these echoes are now filtered through minds shaped by, or reacting to, party dogma." Canby also praised the performances; All of the performers are good, and some are extremely good: Mr. Wiseman, Mr. Hiken, Ms. Shultz, Mr. Jones, Mr. Chandler, even the tiny, chillingly authoritative Ms. Barton." He also described Tomei's performance as "another astonishment."

New York Magazine praised the performances of Wiseman and Barton, "a darling little girl, exhibits consummate charm even in delivering the kind of over-wrought rhetoric Kushner has everyone mouthing". The magazine also notes that Patel's "designed scenery displays considerable grace under pressure".

Publication

Slavs! is published by Broadway Play Publishing Inc. in the collection Plays By Tony Kushner as well as in an acting edition.

References

1994 plays
Plays by Tony Kushner
Off-Broadway plays
LGBT-related plays